Superworm is 2021 British short computer animated TV film based on the 2012 picture book of the same name written by Julia Donaldson and illustrated by Axel Scheffler.

Directed by Jac Hamman and Sarah Scrimgeour, the film was produced by Martin Pope and Barney Goodland of Magic Light Pictures and was adapted from the book by Max Lang and Suzanne Lang, with the score composed by René Aubry.

The film stars Olivia Colman, Matt Smith, Rob Brydon, Kobna Holdbrook-Smith, Patricia Allison and Cariad Lloyd. The film was first broadcast on BBC One on 25 December 2021.

Plot 

Superworm is super-long and super-strong always helping out other animals and insects with his super-body.

An evil wizard wants Superworm to dig a tunnel and find hidden treasure. He sends his crow to capture Superworm.

It is left to the animals and insects to repay the kindness Superworm showed to them by rescuing him.

Voice cast 

 Olivia Colman as the narrator 
 Matt Smith as Superworm 
 Patricia Allison as Butterfly
 Kobna Holdbrook-Smith as Wizard Lizard
 Rob Brydon as Crow
 Paul Thornley as Papa Toad & Beetle
 Cariad Lloyd as Mama Toad
 Felix Tandon as Baby Toad
 Samara Sutariya as Skipping Beetle
 Lizzie Waterworth-Santo as Spider

Reception 
Helen Brown of The Daily Telegraph gave the film a positive review.

References 

2020s English-language films